The national archivist of Norway is the professional and administrative manager of the National Archives of Norway and the National Archival Services of Norway. In addition, the national archivist bears direct responsibility with regard to legislation and regulations.

The position was created in 1839. Henrik Wergeland was appointed the first national archivist in 1840 and entered office in 1841. At that time, the position was limited to serving as head of the National Archives. In 1904 the position was expanded to also encompass the head of the regional state archives.

Inga Bolstad was appointed national archivist in 2014.

List of national archivists
 1840–1845 Henrik Wergeland
 1845–1861 Christian C. A. Lange
 1861–1863 Peter Andreas Munch
 1863–1896 Michael Birkeland
 1896–1905 Henrik Jørgen Huitfeldt-Kaas
 1905–1912 Ebbe Hertzberg
 1912–1933 Kristian Brinch Koren
 1933–1960 Asgaut Steinnes
 1961–1964 Reidar Omang (Hallvard Trætteberg as acting national archivist, 1963–64)
 1965–1982 Dagfinn Mannsåker
 1983–2006 John Herstad
 2006–2014 Ivar Fonnes
 2014– Inga Bolstad

References

External links
Website of the national archivist of Norway

Titles
National Archival Services of Norway